The space allocation problem (SAP) is the process in architecture, or in any kind of space planning (SP) technique, of determining the position and size of several elements according to the input-specified design program requirements. These are usually topological and geometric constraints, as well as matters related to the positioning of openings according to their geometric dimensions, in a two- or three-dimensional space.

Optimization algorithms and methods
Property management